WarGames is a 1984 video game developed by Coleco for the ColecoVision, and later ported to the 
Atari 8-bit family and Commodore 64. The game's goal is to defend the United States against nuclear attack, much in the style of a less frantic Missile Command. The principal designer was Coleco staffer Joseph Angiolillo.

Joseph Angiolillo presented a one-hour seminar on the creation of WarGames at the August 2011 Board Game Players Convention in Lancaster, PA where he showed a DVD of his creation process and memos and lists from Coleco showing the designers of each Coleco product.

The game was directly inspired by MGM's 1983 film WarGames, but instead of depicting the film's events, it adapts its iconic NORAD scene into playable form.

Gameplay 

As the game begins, the iconic line "Greetings Professor Falken:" appears on the screen, quickly followed by, in a box: "Select a Challenge Level from 1 to 8 for Global Thermonuclear War". After the skill level has been chosen, the main game screen appears.

The continental United States is divided into six sectors, each with its own bases and major cities. ICBMs and bombers rain over the North Pole, while submarines inch toward coasts. Defenses consist of ABMs, interceptor aircraft, submarines and an experimental particle beam satellite that trumps everything else but weaves in and out of sectors on a fixed orbit. US units are individually far superior, but vulnerable to the destruction of interceptor and missile bases. Events proceed in real time in all sectors as defenses gradually crumble.

Enemy presence and the destruction of bases and cities lower a sector's Defense Condition (DEFCON) status. The DEFCON level for each sector is factored into the total DEFCON status. If it stays at 1 for 60 successive seconds, or if at any time all cities and bases have been destroyed, an automated counterstrike triggers global thermonuclear war and loses the game. The game is won by preventing a counterstrike long enough for a cease-fire to be reached. With eight difficulty levels, one game takes approximately four to eight minutes.

The game is visually stark and technical by 1984 standards. As in the original movie, the manual hints that the attack is an imagined result of a computer glitch; the counterstrike is not.

See also 
 DEFCON
 WarGames: Defcon 1

References

External links 
 

1984 video games
Atari 8-bit family games
ColecoVision games
Cold War video games
Commodore 64 games
Video games about nuclear war and weapons
Video games about video games
Video games based on films
War video games set in the United States
Video games developed in the United States